A Banbury cake is a spiced, oval-shaped, currant-filled pastry. Since the mid-1800s Banbury cakes have grown more similar to Eccles cake but the earlier versions of Banbury cakes are quite different from the modern pastry. Besides currants, the filling typically includes mixed peel, brown sugar, rum, and nutmeg. Banbury cakes are traditionally enjoyed with afternoon tea.

Once made and sold exclusively in Banbury, England, Banbury cakes have been made in the region to secret recipes since 1586 and are still made there today, although not in such quantity. The cakes were once sent as far afield as Australia, the East Indies and America, normally in locally-made wickerwork baskets. They were sold at rail station refreshment rooms in England.

Banbury cakes were first made by Edward Welchman, whose shop was on Parsons Street. Documented recipes were published by Gervase Markham (in The English Huswife, 1615, pages 75–76) and others during the 17th century. These recipes generally differ greatly from the modern idea of a Banbury cake; later recipes are more similar to tarts or turnovers than cakes. An Elizabethan recipe includes flavourings such as musk and rosewater that would not be commonly seen in a modern preparation.

Queen Victoria was presented with Banbury cakes on her journey from Osborne to Balmoral each August. The notorious 19th century refreshment rooms at Swindon railway station sold "Banbury cakes and pork pies (obviously stale)". In the novel by Norman Collins,  London Belongs to Me, set in 1939, Connie eats a Banbury cake at Victoria Station.

References
Notes

Bibliography

External links
 Modernised version of Gervase Markham recipe 

English cuisine
British cakes
Yeast breads
Sweet breads
Fruit dishes
Banbury